Delaware Park–Front Park System is a historic park system and national historic district in the northern and western sections of Buffalo in Erie County, New York.  The park system was designed by Frederick Law Olmsted and Calvert Vaux and developed between 1868 and 1876.

The park system was listed on the National Register of Historic Places in 1982.

Components
The Delaware Park–Front Park System encompasses the following parts:

Delaware Park
The centerpiece of the Buffalo, New York parks system and located in the North Buffalo neighborhood. The  park was named simply The Park by Olmsted; it was later renamed Delaware Park because of its proximity to Delaware Avenue, Buffalo's mansion row.  It is divided into two areas: the  "Meadow Park" on the east and the  "Water Park", with what was originally a  lake ("Gala Water"), on the west. The  ravine and picnic grove on the south side of the lake comprise a subdivision of the latter.  A widening of Scajaquada Creek, which flows westward through the park, is called Hoyt Lake (originally Mirror Lake). The lake was a feature during the Pan-American Exposition. The Scajaquada Expressway bisects the park west to east.

The Albright-Knox Art Gallery occupies the park's western edge, overlooking Hoyt Lake, and the Buffalo History Museum is situated on its northern edge, overlooking Scajaquada Creek.  The park is home to Shakespeare in Delaware Park, a summer tradition since the mid-1970s, and the second largest free outdoor Shakespeare festival in the United States (after New York City's).  It is also the location of the Buffalo Zoo on the east side of Meadow Park.  The park also has a golf course, four baseball diamonds, cross country running, tennis courts, and a few soccer fields.

Contributing structures are: Caretakers Cottage (1889); Lincoln Parkway Bridge (1900), designed by Green and Wicks; Rose Garden Pergola (1912); Stone Bridge (ca. 1887), the only remaining structure from the original Olmsted plan; Parkside Lodge (1914); Rumsey Shelter House (1900); Main Zoo Building (1935-1940); Shelter House (ca. 1900); and Elephant House (ca. 1912).  Located north of the park are the Parkside East Historic District and Parkside West Historic District and to the south are the Elmwood Historic District–East and Elmwood Historic District–West, all listed on the National Register of Historic Places.

Statue of David
The park is also home to a noted replica of Michelangelo's David. The statue was dedicated in 1903, one of only a few made directly from the original sculpture but included a fig leaf which was not present in the original. When the statue was rededicated in 2013, it was given a new plaque which corrected the spelling of the artist name from Michael Angelo to Michelangelo.

Gates Circle
The circle's center contains a monumental sunken fountain constructed in 1904.

Chapin Parkway
Connects Gates Circle and Soldier's Place;  in length.

Soldier's Place
Consists of an  area  in diameter at the juncture of Bidwell Parkway, Lincoln Parkway, Bird Avenue, and Chapin Parkway.  Frank Lloyd Wright's William R. Heath House (1904) overlooks the circle at Bird Avenue.

Lincoln Parkway
A ,  thoroughfare, connecting Soldier's Place to Delaware Park;  in length.

Bidwell Parkway
A ,  thoroughfare, connecting Colonial Circle to Soldier's Place;  in length.  At its intersection with Soldier's Place is a large bronze sculpture by Larry Griffiths titled Birds in Flight (1980).

Colonial Circle

Formerly Bidwell Place; a  plot, at the intersection of Richmond Avenue, Bidwell Parkway, and Lafayette Avenue.  The circle's center contains an equestrian statue of General Daniel D. Bidwell.

Richmond Avenue
It traverses Ferry Circle at West Ferry Street.

Ferry Circle
A  circle at the intersection of West Ferry Street, Massachusetts Street, and Richmond Avenue.

Symphony Circle
Originally known as just The Circle. A ,  circle at the juncture of Porter Avenue with Richmond Avenue, North Street, Pennsylvania Street, and Wadsworth Street. Due south of the circle lies First Presbyterian Church, Buffalo's oldest congregation. Kleinhans Music Hall is located on the southeast side of the circle; it was designated a National Historic Landmark in 1989.  The circle is located within the Allentown Historic District.

Porter Avenue
A former city street incorporated into the parks system; connects Symphony Circle to Columbus Park and Front Park.

Columbus Park
Formerly Prospect Park; located at the intersection of Niagara Street and Porter Avenue; the site of the Connecticut Street Armory. The park is located adjacent to D'Youville College and is home to a branch of the Buffalo & Erie County Public Library.  The Shelter House (ca. 1908) is a contributing structure.

Front Park
Formerly The Front; a  park located at the beginning of the Niagara River and overlooking Lake Erie.  The park is home to the U.S. entrance to the Peace Bridge, erected in 1927 on the site of the former Fort Porter, and includes baseball diamonds, large open playing fields, and tennis courts.  The park contains a monument to Commodore Oliver Hazard Perry.  The Picnic Shelter (ca. 1900) is a contributing structure.

See also
Cazenovia Park-South Park System

References

External links

Delaware Park - Buffalo Olmsted Parks Conservancy
Olmsted Parks in Buffalo from Stanton M. Broderick
Buffalo as an Architectural Museum, "Municipal Parks and City Planning: Frederick Law Olmsted's Buffalo Park and Parkway System," by Francis R. Kowsky, Reprinted with permission from the Journal of the Society of Architectural Historians, March 1987.
The Best Planned City An online film about Frederick Law Olmsted and the Buffalo Park System
Short video of the Bidwell Parkway
National Archives Catalog - National Archives record for Delaware Park - Front Park System

Geography of Buffalo, New York
Baseball venues in New York (state)
Cross country running courses in New York (state)
Golf clubs and courses in New York (state)
Soccer venues in New York (state)
Tennis venues in New York (state)
Tourist attractions in Buffalo, New York
Parks in Erie County, New York
Historic districts in Buffalo, New York
Frederick Law Olmsted works
Historic districts on the National Register of Historic Places in New York (state)
National Register of Historic Places in Buffalo, New York